Operation Karton was a secret military operation during August 1983 by the South African Defence Force (SADF) during the South African Border War and Angolan Civil War.

Background
Cangamba is an Angolan town in the province of Moxico. It was garrisoned by soldiers of FAPLA's 32 Brigade and forty to sixty Cuban instructors and due to the conditions of the roads in the region, was supplied by air from Menongue. During late July, UNITA had briefly raided the town but FAPLA failed to strengthen its defences. UNITA sought the help of the SADF for mortar and artillery training as well as fire support in the next attack against Cangamba. A SADF artillery team was formed and flown to a secret special forces base in the Caprivi where they met to train the UNITA artillerymen in captured Soviet 120 mm mortars and 76 mm artillery before moving northwards into Angola.

Battle
UNITA attacked on 1 August with between 3000 and 6000 soldiers with the SADF team assisting the next day with artillery observation. The FAPLA troops in Cangamba called for reinforcements which were assembled in Huambo, Menongue and Lubango but would take a week to cross UNITA territory to reach the garrison. The FAPLA garrison was bombarded by UNITA artillery for three days before attempting frontal assaults which incurred high casualties. UNITA then resorted to digging trenches driving them closer to the Angolan positions. The UNITA artillery attack continued and by the 7 August the FAPLA and Cuban troops were short of ammunition and water. By this time the UNITA troops were being subjected to FAPLA/Cuban air attacks and took casualties. On the 10 August, the FAPLA relief columns arrived covered by a FAPLA/Cuban air strike on UNITA positions. The Cuban troop were said to be airlifted out while garrison and relief columns had to fight their way out. Two days after the relief columns arrived, the South African Air Force (SAAF) was called in on 12 August to assist UNITA. Canberra bombers and Impala aircraft were used to flatten the town and by 14 August the battle was over.

Aftermath
UNITA was said to have lost 1100 soldiers and possibly the same amount wounded while estimates of FAPLA losses range from sixty to seventy killed and 157 wounded to several hundred casualties. Cuban losses totaled seventeen dead and thirty wounded.

References

Further reading 
 
 

1983 in South Africa
1983 in Angola
Battles and operations of the South African Border War
Military operations of the Angolan Civil War
Conflicts in 1983
July 1983 events in Africa
August 1983 events in Africa